The Board of Management of the Chinese Permanent Cemeteries (BMCPC), established in 1913, is a statutory body of Hong Kong under the Chinese Permanent Cemeteries Ordinance (Cap. 1112) enacted in 1964. It manages four Chinese permanent cemeteries in the territory.

The term 'Permanent' refers to the cemetery site, not the graves.

Cemeteries
The four cemeteries managed by the BMCPC are:
 Aberdeen Chinese Permanent Cemetery
 Cape Collinson Chinese Permanent Cemetery
 Tseung Kwan O Chinese Permanent Cemetery
 Tsuen Wan Chinese Permanent Cemetery

See also
 List of cemeteries in Hong Kong

References

External links

 Official website

Statutory bodies in Hong Kong
Death in Hong Kong
1913 establishments in Asia